Tailapa may refer to:

 Tailapa I, a feudatory to the Rashtrakutas, ancestor of Tailapa II and Tailapa III
 Tailapa II (r. 993–997), founder of the Western Chalukya dynasty of India
 Tailapa III (r. 1151–1164), Western Chalukya king of India